Puthalapattu SC (Scheduled Caste) is an Assembly legislative constituency of Andhra Pradesh. It is one among 7 constituencies in Chittoor district.

M.Babu of YSR Congress Party is currently representing the constituency.

Mandals

Members of Legislative Assembly Puthalapattu

Assembly elections 2019

Assembly elections 2014

Assembly elections 2009

 

Source: Constituency results

See also
 Puthalapattu

References

Assembly constituencies of Andhra Pradesh